The 2016–17 season was Football Club Crotone's first ever season in Serie A. The club competed in the two Italian domestic competitions, finishing 17th in the league while being eliminated in the third round of the Coppa Italia. Crotone miraculously avoided relegation on the final day of the season, defeating Lazio 3–1 while already-relegated U.S. Città di Palermo secured a 2–1 victory over Empoli which doomed the Tuscan side to Serie B.

Players

Squad information

Transfers

In

Out

Pre-season and friendlies

Competitions

Overall

Last updated: 28 May 2017

Serie A

League table

Results summary

Results by round

Matches

Coppa Italia

Statistics

Appearances and goals

|-
! colspan=14 style=background:#DCDCDC; text-align:center| Goalkeepers

|-
! colspan=14 style=background:#DCDCDC; text-align:center| Defenders

|-
! colspan=14 style=background:#DCDCDC; text-align:center| Midfielders

|-
! colspan=14 style=background:#DCDCDC; text-align:center| Forwards

|-
! colspan=14 style=background:#DCDCDC; text-align:center| Players transferred out during the season

Goalscorers

Last updated: 28 May 2017

Clean sheets

Last updated: 28 May 2017

Disciplinary record

Last updated: 28 May 2017

References

F.C. Crotone seasons
Crotone